Discovery Life is a Polish television channel owned by TVN, a division of Warner Bros. Discovery, which produces documentary, feature and entertainment films and series. In Poland, the channel replaced Animal Planet in SD quality on 1 February 2015. At the time of launch, the station was available in 55.5% of households in Poland. On 16 January 2017, Discovery Life began broadcasting in HD quality, replacing the previously released SD version.

References

External links
 

Warner Bros. Discovery networks
Television channels in Poland
Television channels and stations established in 2015
2015 establishments in Poland
Polish-language television stations
Mass media in Warsaw